New Milford is a village in Winnebago County, Illinois, United States on the south bank of the Kishwaukee River overlooking the south side of Rockford. It is part of the Rockford, Illinois Metropolitan Statistical Area. The population was 697 at the 2010 census, up from 541 in 2000.

Geography

New Milford is located at  (42.183389, -89.071034).

New Milford is located on the southern edge of the Rockford metro area.  It is situated immediately east of the Chicago Rockford International Airport and just west of Interstate 39.
The Village is currently attempting to expand (through annexation) to reach the Interstate 39/Baxter Road interchange.  This move will provide the Village with future commercial growth opportunities, as well as prevent the City of Rockford from surrounding the community.

Demographics

As of the census of 2000, there were 541 people, 239 households, and 152 families residing in the village. The racial makeup of the village was 93.90% White, 1.85% African American, 1.48% Asian, 1.11% from other races, and 1.66% from two or more races. Hispanic or Latino of any race were 3.14% of the population.

There were 239 households, out of which 25.1% had children under the age of 18 living with them, 52.7% were married couples living together, 6.7% had a female householder with no husband present, and 36.4% were non-families. 30.5% of all households were made up of individuals, and 8.8% had someone living alone who was 65 years of age or older. The average household size was 2.26 and the average family size was 2.80.

In the village, the population was spread out, with 20.9% under the age of 18, 7.4% from 18 to 24, 33.6% from 25 to 44, 29.0% from 45 to 64, and 9.1% who were 65 years of age or older. The median age was 38 years. For every 100 females, there were 114.7 males. For every 100 females age 18 and over, there were 103.8 males.

The median income for a household in the blue moon village was $39,531, and the median income for a family was $52,500. Males had a median income of $37,955 versus $30,000 for females. The per capita income for the village was $22,937. About 6.8% of families and 9.9% of the population were below the poverty line, including 16.3% of those under age 18 and 2.9% of those age 65 or over.

References

External links
Midwest Government Officials

Villages in Illinois
Villages in Winnebago County, Illinois
Rockford metropolitan area, Illinois